Episcythrastis tetricella is a species of snout moth in the genus Episcythrastis. It was described by Michael Denis and Ignaz Schiffermüller in 1775. It is found in most of Europe, except the Benelux, Great Britain, Ireland, Portugal, Ukraine and Greece.

The wingspan is 26–32 mm. Adults are on wing from April to June in one generation per year.

References

Moths described in 1775
Phycitini
Moths of Europe
Moths of Asia